Power Rangers Lightspeed Rescue is a television series and the eighth season of the Power Rangers franchise, based on the 23rd Super Sentai series Kyuukyuu Sentai GoGoFive (1999).

Lightspeed Rescue had, for the first time, a Power Ranger with no Super Sentai counterpart in the Titanium Ranger, as there was no regular sixth Ranger in GoGo V, which makes it the only season to have an American-exclusive Sixth Ranger.

Synopsis
The series takes place in the fictitious city of Mariner Bay, California, which was built on an ancient demon burial ground. When the demons were accidentally released from their tomb in the desert, they threaten to destroy Mariner Bay. Therefore, a government organization called Lightspeed, headed by Captain William Mitchell, recruits four civilians and his own daughter to defend the city as a new team of Power Rangers after Lightspeed successfully channels the source of their powers, the Morphin Grid. Each of the four civilians chosen had a special area of expertise: Carter Grayson, the Red Lightspeed Ranger, was a fire fighter in the local fire department; Chad Lee, the Blue Lightspeed Ranger, worked as a lifeguard and marine animal trainer at a local aquarium and a marine amusement park; Joel Rawlings, the Green Lightspeed Ranger, was a stunt pilot; Kelsey Winslow, the Yellow Lightspeed Ranger, was an extreme sports athlete; and Dana Mitchell, the Captain's daughter, who agreed to become the Pink Lightspeed Ranger, was a paramedic and practiced medical arts. The five Power Rangers were aided by a team of scientists and engineers led by Miss Angela Fairweather, and operated out of the Lightspeed Aquabase, an underwater military compound that also deters the hydrophobic demons from directly attacking the base.

The five Rangers would be joined by Captain Mitchell's long lost son, Ryan Mitchell, who would become the Titanium Ranger. Together, the six Rangers would prevail against the demon forces time after time, culminating in a final showdown where, in Power Rangers tradition, all of the Zords, the base, and much of the weapons and other equipment that was used by the Power Rangers over the series was destroyed.

In addition, Lightspeed Rescue featured a reunion reappearance of characters from Power Rangers Lost Galaxy, when the villainess Trakeena comes to Earth to destroy it and the Lightspeed Rangers team up with the Galaxy Rangers.

Cast and characters
Lightspeed Rangers
Sean Cw Johnson as Carter Grayson, the Red Lightspeed Ranger
Michael Chaturantabut as Chad Lee, the Blue Lightspeed Ranger
Keith Robinson as Joel Rawlings, the Green Lightspeed Ranger
Sasha Williams as Kelsey Winslow, the Yellow Lightspeed Ranger
Alison MacInnis as Dana Mitchell, the Pink Lightspeed Ranger
Rhett Fisher as Ryan Mitchell, the Titanium Ranger

Supporting characters
Monica Louwerens as Ms. Angela Fairweather
Ron Roggé as Captain William Mitchell

Villains
Jennifer L. Yen as Vypra
Diane Salinger as the voice of Queen Bansheera
Neil Kaplan as the voice of Diabolico
Michael Forest as the voice of Prince Olympius
Brianne Siddall as the voice of Impus
David Lodge as the voice of Loki
Kim Strauss as the voice of Jinxer

Guest stars
Danny Slavin as Leo Corbett, the Red Galaxy Ranger
Archie Kao as Kai Chen, the Blue Galaxy Ranger
Reggie Rolle as Damon Henderson, the Green Galaxy Ranger
Cerina Vincent as Maya, the Yellow Galaxy Ranger
Valerie Vernon as Kendrix Morgan, the Pink Galaxy Ranger
Jennifer Burns as Trakeena

Video game

Several video games based on Power Rangers Lightspeed Rescue were also developed and available for Nintendo 64, Game Boy Color, PlayStation, and PC. The PlayStation and N64 versions were 3D beat-em up games, the Game Boy version was a 2D side-scrolling platformer, and the PC version was actually an activity center.

Episodes

References

External links

 
  at Fox Kids
 

 
Lightspeed Rescue
Science fantasy television series
Television shows filmed in Los Angeles
Television shows filmed in Santa Clarita, California
Television shows set in California
2000s American science fiction television series
2000 American television series debuts
2000 American television series endings
Fox Kids
Fox Broadcasting Company original programming
English-language television shows
Television series about families
Television series about siblings
Television series by Saban Entertainment
Television series about size change
American children's action television series
American children's adventure television series
American children's fantasy television series
Television shows adapted into video games
Television series created by Haim Saban